Acceptance is the experience of a situation without an intention to change that situation.

Acceptance may also refer to:

The arts
 Acceptance (band), an alternative-rock band
 Acceptance (film), a 2009 drama television film starring Mae Whitman and Joan Cusack
 "Acceptance" (Everwood), a season 3 episode of the television series Everwood
 "Acceptance" (House), an episode of the television series House
 "Acceptance" (Heroes), an episode of the television series Heroes
 Acceptance (novel), the last book in Jeff VanderMeer's Southern Reach trilogy

Other uses
 Beam acceptance, in physics, the maximum emittance that a beam transport system or analysing system is able to transmit
 Acceptance testing, a validation test in engineering
 Offer and acceptance, a legal term related to contract law
 Bankers' acceptance, a type of bank draft
 "Acceptance for value," a fraudulent debt payment method promoted in the redemption movement

See also
 Accept (disambiguation)
 Acceptability, the property of a thing to be able to be accepted